James Cockburn may refer to:

Sir James Cockburn, 8th Baronet (1729–1804), Scottish politician
Sir James Cockburn, 9th Baronet (1771–1852), Scottish soldier
James Cockburn (cricketer) (1916–1990), Australian cricketer
James Cockburn (Ontario politician) (1819–1883), Canadian politician in early 19th century Canada
James Cockburn (Lower Canada politician) (c. 1763–1819), physician and politician in Lower Canada
James Cockburn (minister) (1882–1973), Scottish clergyman and scholar
James Cockburn (Royal Navy officer) (1817–1872), Commander-in-Chief, East Indies Station
James Pattison Cockburn (1779–1847), artist, author and military officer

See also
James Coburn (disambiguation)